The multiple audience dilemma happens when a person (or group) creates different images of themselves for different audiences.  For example:

 To one audience, the person might appear as a nerd.  
 To the other audience, the person might appear as a partyer.

When the person and the different audiences meet together, the person must somehow present a common image that both audiences find acceptable.

This multiple audience dilemma might happen through choosing to act in a specific way to convey a personality that matches both images of the self that both audiences are familiar with, as a way of compromising for both audiences without one or both.

This is also known as the multiple audience problem.

Studies

One study conducted in 2000 provides information to support the idea that the multiple audience dilemma is flawed. The study suggests that the task of entertaining multiple audiences at once is difficult and also shows that most participants were more convinced that they had performed a better job then what was actually portrayed. 
The first part of this study, a single person had to portray themselves as either a party animal or a nerd in an isolated interview with two separate individuals and later was asked to maintain both images at once while being interviewed once more by the same people, without revealing to either audience members that the participant was performing. Then, the audience member scored what they thought of the participant after both encounters and the scores were compared afterwards. The participant did the task of portraying themselves while individually being interviewed and in the situation, but they performed better when they only had to think of one audience and how they actually performed was worse than how they felt they handled the situation.
The second study focused on letting a group of five or six individuals become familiar with each other by having them talk to the group while answering questions for five minutes. Once everyone was familiar, the participants had to read an essay assigned to them and choose a keyword out of the assigned five words hidden in the essay, that then must be read to ten or twelve individuals, half being the familiar and the unfamiliar make up the rest of the group. The key of this task is to tell the participant's group what the keyword is, without telling the other group. The familiarized group felt like they would perform better because they knew each other, the results however showed to obvious changes, making both the familiar and unfamiliar groups equal at guessing the keyword. This however is only after knowing a person for a few moments and does not conclude that long-term relationships will have the same results, due to learning each other's individual personalities rather than a five-minute familiarization session with a group of strangers.

References

Further reading

Conceptions of self